Honoré Fragonard (13 June 1732 – 5 April 1799) was a French anatomist, now remembered primarily for his remarkable collection of écorchés (flayed figures) in the Musée Fragonard d'Alfort.

Fragonard was born in Grasse as cousin to painter Jean-Honoré Fragonard. After studying surgery, in 1759 he obtained his license and in 1762 was recruited by Claude Bourgelat, founder of the world's first veterinary school in Lyon. There Fragonard began to make his first anatomical exhibits. In 1765 Louis XV initiated a veterinary school in Paris, first resident at rue Sainte Appoline but in 1766 moving to the suburb of Alfort (today the École nationale vétérinaire d'Alfort in Maisons-Alfort). There Fragonard served as the school's first professor of anatomy for six years, preparing thousands of anatomical pieces, but was expelled in 1771 as a madman. His ostentatious specimens were housed among many other objects of natural history and comparative anatomy.  He subsequently continued to prepare dissections in his home, gaining income by selling his works to the aristocracy.

Fragonard was careful in his dissections and preserved the results via means never divulged, but which may have been based on those of Jean-Joseph Sue. His pieces were often prepared for theatrical effect rather than scientific exhibition, as can be seen in the surviving pieces in the Musée Fragonard d'Alfort. In 1793, along with his cousin, he became a member of the Jury national des arts, and in the following year the Commission temporaire des arts. In this position he collected his work at Alfort for an envisioned Office national d'anatomie; but it never materialized and most of his work was dispersed. Despondent, he subsequently was named director of anatomy at the newly created École de santé de Paris, but died in Charenton on 5 April 1799.

Honoré Fragonard in fiction 
Honoré Fragonard appears in a brief but important role in Susanne Alleyn's historical mystery novel The Cavalier of the Apocalypse (2009).
Fragonard is the central character of the French novel Le Cousin de Fragonard (2006) by Patrick Roegiers.
Fragonard and one of his works is mentioned in the novel Austerlitz (2001) by W.G. Sebald.

See also 
 Musée d'Anatomie Delmas-Orfila-Rouvière
 Écorché
 Androtomy
 Plastination

References 

 
 Jonathan Simon, "Honoré Fragonard, anatomical virtuoso", in Science and Spectacle in the European Enlightenment, edited by Bernadette Bensaude-Vincent and Christine Blondel, Aldershot, Ashgate, 2008.
 Marc Mammerickx, Claude Bourgelat, avocat des vétérinaires, 1971. 
 Cozop article

1732 births
1799 deaths
People from Grasse
French anatomists